This is a list of past and present members of the Senate of Canada representing the territories of Yukon, Nunavut and the Northwest Territories. The territories are currently represented by one senator each.

The Northwest Territories was granted two Senate seats in 1879 and doubled to four seats in 1903. After Alberta and Saskatchewan were created in 1905, the territories would not have Senate representation until the Constitution Act of 1975 that gave one seat to the Northwest Territories and one seat to the Yukon. Nunavut was granted one seat upon its creation in 1999 from the Nunavut Act of 1993.

Current

Historic

Northwest Territories
The Northwest Territories had representation in the Senate in the early years post-Confederation. After the creation of Alberta and Saskatchewan, however, the territories were not represented in the Senate until 1975.

Yukon
Created in 1898 the first senator for Yukon was appointed in 1975.

Nunavut

See also
Lists of Canadian senators

Notes

References

Territorial senators

Senators
Senators
Senators
Senators
Senators
Senators